The RD-193 is a high performance single-combustion chamber rocket engine, developed in Russia from 2011 to 2013. It is derived from the RD-170 originally used in the Energia launcher.

The RD-193 is fueled by a kerosene / LOX mixture and uses an oxygen-rich staged combustion cycle.
RD-193 was proposed as a replacement for the NK-33, which is being used in the Soyuz-2-1v vehicle.

Design
The engine is a simplified version of the RD-191, omitting the swing assembly chamber and its related structural elements, thus reducing size and weight (300 kg) and lowering cost.

See also 
Comparison of orbital rocket engines

References

External links

Rocket engines of Russia
Rocket engines using kerosene propellant
Rocket engines using the staged combustion cycle
Energomash rocket engines